The Pal family (also spelt Pala) are a Bengali aristocratic family who had historically held lands in what is now Sylhet, Bangladesh.

History

Among the most ancient clans in their region, the Pals trace their descent from a branch of the imperial Pala dynasty of Bengal, claiming Mahipala I as their ancestor, though it is not possible to ascertain the accuracy of this. Their line became established in Sylhet when one Kalidas Pal acquired land in Panchakhanda (in what is now Beanibazar sub-district), with the estate becoming hereditary among his descendants. The Pals initially ruled their territory as feudal monarchs, styling themselves with the royal title Raja. In the 7th century BS (s CE), the Pal palace and the large dighi (reservoir) it sits beside were constructed by Kalidas's great-grandson, Varanasi Pal. However, three generations later, during the reign of Ramjivan Pal, the kingdom lost its independence, coming under the suzerainty of the Muslim rulers of Bengal.

In spite of this reduction in status, the family enjoyed considerable renown and success as private landowners. Under Pal governance, their territory (previously scarcely inhabited) was significantly developed and cultivated, allowing the migration of groups such as the Mahimals (who were led by their two Sardars Raghai and Basai) into the area. Successive members of the family became notable for their construction of dighi as well as their religious contributions, both through support of Brahmans as well as construction. One younger son, Pratap Chandra Pal, converted to Islam under the name "Prachanda Khan" and established his own separate territory, with his heirs becoming prominent landowners themselves. The general preeminence of the Pal line is displayed in a proverb recorded by the historians Achyut Charan Choudhury and Syed Murtaza Ali:

Translated, this means "Pal, Prachanda, Jangdar. These are the three mirashdars." Thus, making reference to the Pals, the descendants of Prachanda Khan and the unrelated Jangdar clan, the proverb states that there were no other mirashdars beyond these families in the locality.

The influence of the Pals continued into the British era, with Munshi Hari Krishna Pal serving as Dewan to the District Collector of Sylhet. Krishnatay Dewanji, his younger brother, had the title Rai Bahadur awarded to him by the ruling government. The latter's son, Krishna Kishore Pal Chowdhury, founded the Bihani Bazar (Morning Market), from which the town of Beanibazar (now expanded into the sub-district) derives its name.

See also
Nidhanpur copperplate inscription, Panchakhanda

Notes

References

Medieval Bengal
Asian noble families
Bengali families
Bangladeshi families
People from Beanibazar Upazila
Indian families
Hindu families
Bengali Hindus
Bangladeshi Hindus